Cartography is an album by Arve Henriksen.

Background 
On the album Cartography, Henriksen takes us into varied soundscapes that evoke streams of images. Together with his longtime companions Jan Bang and Erik Honore, they add all sort of sampling, processing and production to the mix.

Track listing

Personnel 
 Arve Henriksen - trumpet, voice, field recordings
 Jan Bang – live sampling, beats programming, dictaphone, organ samples
 Erik Honoré – synthesizer, samples, field recordings, choir samples
 Eivind Aarset – guitars
 Ståle Storløkken – synthesizer, samples
 Lars Danielsson – double bass
 Audun Kleive – percussion, drums
 Vérène Andronikof – vocals
 Anna Maria Friman – voice
 Trio Mediæval – voice samples
 David Sylvian – voice, samples, programming

Credits 
 String arrangement, programming by Helge Sunde
 Vocal arrangements by Vytas Sondeckis
 Design by Sascha Kleis
 Treatment effects by Arnaud Mercier
 Mastered by Helge Sten
 Cover photography by Thomas Wunsch
 Linear photography by Johanna Diehl
 Recording, engineering, mixing by Erik Honoré and Jan Bang (tracks: #3-10.1, 12)
 Produced by Erik Honoré, Jan Bang

References

External links 
Arve Henriksen Official Website

2008 albums
Arve Henriksen albums
ECM Records albums